Tribes of Europa is a German sci-fi television series created by Philip Koch that premiered on Netflix on 19 February 2021.

Synopsis
The story is set in 2074, 43 years after a mysterious global technological failure caused nations to slip into anarchy and fracture into dystopian warring tribal microstates. On the European continent, there are hundreds of tribes, but the story focuses on three: the Origines, a tiny, peaceful forest tribe; the Crows, an aggressive warrior society; and the Crimsons, a militaristic society that aims at reuniting Europe by negotiation. 

Three Origine siblings, a young woman, a young man, and their teenage brother, find their peaceful existence in the forest shattered when a pilot from Atlantis crashes an advanced hoverjet in their territory. When the siblings rescue the injured pilot, the youngest sibling recovers a mysterious cube with advanced technology from the wreck. 

The Crows invade the Origine village to secure the technology, massacring most of the inhabitants. The older brother, Kiano, is sent to the Crows' slave factories. The sister, Liv, is knocked out in the massacre and comes to when Crows are searching for the cube. She shoots a female Crow warrior with a crossbow, and both are taken prisoner by the Crimson army. The younger brother, Elja, flees from the massacre with the cube, which is sought after by Crows, Crimson, and other powerful and resourceful figures.

Cast and characters
 Henriette Confurius as Liv
 Emilio Sakraya as Kiano
 David Ali Rashed as Elja
 Melika Foroutan as Varvara
 Oliver Masucci as Moses
 Robert Finster as David
 Benjamin Sadler as Jakob
 Ana Ularu as Grieta
 Jeanette Hain as Amena
 Michaël Erpelding as Atlantian Pilot
 James Faulkner as General Cameron
 Johann Myers as Bracker
 Klaus Tange as Mark
 Sebastian Blomberg as Yvar
 Jannik Schümann as Dewiat
 Alain Blazevic as Crimson
 Hoji Fortuna as Ouk

Episodes

References

External links

  on Netflix
 
 

Post-apocalyptic television series
2021 German television series debuts
2020s science fiction television series
2020s German drama television series
Television series set in the 2070s
Television shows set in Europe
German-language Netflix original programming
Television shows filmed in Croatia